The San Jerónimo Dam is a dam located near the hill of La Tecolota in the town of San Jerónimo, Jalisco, Mexico. The dam was built at a cost of 8,461,000; it was inaugurated on February 10, 2009 by the state governor Emilio González Márquez.

Cause of construction
The dam was built to relieve the serious problem of the community's need of public water. The dam is planned to supply water for the approximately 700 homes in the community. The dam will also seek to promote aquaculture, tourism, and environmental care which may trigger the economic development of the residents.

References

External links
SEDER entrega presa para uso doméstico en San Martín Hidalgo

Dams in Mexico
Dams completed in 2009